HMS Laertes  was a  built for the Royal Navy during the 1910s.

Description
The Laforey class were improved and faster versions of the preceding . They displaced . Laertes was powered by two Parsons direct-drive steam turbines, each driving one propeller shaft, using steam provided by four Yarrow boilers. The ships' complement was 74 officers and ratings.

The ships were armed with three single QF  Mark IV guns and two QF 1.5-pounder (37 mm) anti-aircraft guns. These latter guns were later replaced by a pair of QF 2-pounder (40 mm) "pom-pom" anti-aircraft guns. The ships were also fitted with two above-water twin mounts for  torpedoes.

Construction and service
The ship was launched from the yards of Swan, Hunter & Wigham Richardson, Wallsend, on 5 June 1913 under the name HMS Sarpedon. The destroyer was renamed HMS Laertes on 30 September 1913. She possessed three 4-inch guns and four torpedo tubes, and was designed to operate in British coastal waters against enemy surface and submarine shipping. Laertes became part of the 3rd Destroyer Flotilla based at Harwich. She took part in the Battle of Heligoland Bight on 28 August 1914, where she was seriously damaged suffering four shell strikes. The most serious struck the boiler room, temporarily cutting off all steam supplies to the engines leaving the ship motionless. Another shot destroyed the middle funnel, while a gun was also hit. While Laertes was seriously damaged and stopped in the water,  went to her aid under heavy fire.  Lieutenant Commander Gye manoeuvred to pass a tow, but in getting underway the towing hawser parted.  Laertes was saved only by the arrival of the battle cruiser . The ship managed to restore some power but had to be towed back to England.

Laertes was one of the destroyers of the Harwich squadron which attempted to head off attacking German ships during the Bombardment of Yarmouth and Lowestoft on 25 April 1916. The ship was hit by shellfire damaging the boiler room, and would most likely have sunk except for the actions of Stoker Ernest Clarke. Clarke later died from burns received while saving the ship and was posthumously awarded the Distinguished Service Medal. Five of the crew were injured during the attack. Stoker Petty Officer Stephen Pritchard, who entered the cabin flat immediately after a shell had exploded there, and worked a fire hose, was awarded the Distinguished Service Medal.

In 1917 Laertes was transferred to escort duties. She was sold on 1 December 1921 to Stanlee, of Dover for breaking up. She ran aground at Newhaven, East Sussex, on 8 March 1922 while under tow to the breaker's yard after her tow parted. She was later refloated and arrived at Dover on 13 March 1922 for scrapping. She was scrapped that year.

Notes

Bibliography

External links
Ernest Clarke Memorial

 

Laforey-class destroyers (1913)
Ships built on the River Tyne
1913 ships
World War I destroyers of the United Kingdom
Maritime incidents in 1922